A Very Swingin' Basie Christmas! is a 2015 Christmas album by the Count Basie Orchestra, directed by Scotty Barnhart, and released by Concord Records. The album was recorded between August 2014 and July 2015.

Track listing
 "Jingle Bells" (Pierpont) [2:37]
 "Let It Snow" – with Ellis Marsalis (Styne/Cahn) [5:56]
 "It's the Holiday Season" – with Johnny Mathis (Thompson) [4:02]
 "Silent Night" (Gruber/Mohr/traditional) [3:25]
 "Good "Swing" Wenceslas" (Helmore/Neale/traditional) [3:35]
 "The Christmas Song" – with Ledisi (Torme/Wells) [3:42]
 "Little Drummer Boy" (Davis/Onorati/Simeone) [4:51]
 "Sleigh Ride" (Anderson/Parish) [3:50]
 "Have Yourself a Merry Little Christmas" – with Carmen Bradford (Blane/Martin) [5:04]
 "Winter Wonderland" (Bernard/Smith) [3:10]
 "I'll Be Home for Christmas" – with Ellis Marsalis & Plas Johnson (Gannon/Kent/Ram) [4:31]

References

2015 Christmas albums
Christmas albums by American artists
Count Basie Orchestra albums
Concord Records albums
Swing Christmas albums